The Michael Franks Anthology: The Art of Love is a jazz vocal double album by Michael Franks, released in 2003 by Warner Bros. It is Franks' eighteenth album, and his third compilation after his non-U.S.A. Indispensable released in 1988 and The Best of Michael Franks: A Backward Glance in 1998.

The compilation contains a selection of tracks over two discs spanning twenty three years, from The Art of Tea in 1976, to Barefoot on the Beach in 1999.

Track listing

Reception

Writing for AllMusic, Stephen Thomas Erlewine commented, "All the hits are here, along with a sharp selection of album tracks, pretty much rounding up all the highlights from his rich, extensive career. Diehards will still want the albums, but serious fans who want just one Michael Franks album will need this."

References

Bibliography

Michael Franks (musician) compilation albums
2003 compilation albums
Warner Records compilation albums